The 2016 Città di Caltanissetta was a professional tennis tournament played on clay courts. It was the 18th edition of the tournament which was part of the 2016 ATP Challenger Tour. It took place in Caltanissetta, Italy between 4 and 12 June 2016.

Singles main-draw entrants

Seeds

 1 Rankings are as of May 30, 2016.

Other entrants
The following players received wildcards into the singles main draw:
  Matteo Donati
  Omar Giacalone
  Paolo Lorenzi
  Gianluigi Quinzi

The following player received entry into the singles main draw with a protected ranking:
  Julian Reister

The following players received entry from the qualifying draw:
  Filip Horanský
  Nicolás Jarry
  Antonio Massara
  Sumit Nagal

Champions

Singles

Doubles

External links
Official Website

Citta di Caltanissetta
Città di Caltanissetta